The yellow bishop (Euplectes capensis), also known as Cape bishop, Cape widow or yellow-rumped widow, is a resident breeding bird species in Angola, Botswana, Burundi, Cameroon, Congo, Equatorial Guinea, Eswatini, Ethiopia, Kenya, Lesotho, Malawi, Mozambique, Nigeria, Rwanda, South Africa, South Sudan, Tanzania, Uganda, Zambia and Zimbabwe.

This common weaver occurs in less arid vegetated areas, such as fynbos, moist grassland and bracken-covered valleys at altitudes from sea level to the Ethiopian highlands.

Taxonomy
In 1760 the French zoologist Mathurin Jacques Brisson included a description of the yellow bishop in his Ornithologie based on a specimen collected from the Cape of Good Hope. He used the French name Le pinçon du Cap de Bonne Espérance and the Latin Fringilla Capitis Bonae Spei. Although Brisson coined Latin names, these do not conform to the binomial system and are not recognised by the International Commission on Zoological Nomenclature. When in 1766 the Swedish naturalist Carl Linnaeus updated his Systema Naturae for the twelfth edition, he added 240 species that had been previously described by Brisson. One of these was the yellow bishop. Linnaeus included a brief description, coined the binomial name Loxia capensis and cited Brisson's work. The specific name capensis denotes the Cape of Good Hope.  This species is now placed in the genus Euplectes that was introduced by the English naturalist William John Swainson in 1829 with the southern red bishop as the type species. There are six subspecies.

Description
The breeding male is black apart from his bright yellow lower back, rump, and shoulder patches, and brown edging to the wing feathers. He has a short crest, thick conical black bill, and a relatively short tail. His bill size varies dramatically between races.

In non-breeding plumage, the black plumage is replaced by heavily streaked buffy-brown, and the bill is pale. The yellow shoulders and rump remain, and are a distinction from the female which lacks the contrasting colour patches. The juveniles and females are notoriously difficult to identify in the field, appearing identical to the juveniles and females of several other bishops and widowbirds as well as some seedeaters.

In the breeding season they are usually solitary or in pairs, but the non-breeding yellow bishop is gregarious, often forming flocks with other 'mixed euplectes'.

They feed on seed, grain and some insects.

Voice
Calls include , and a harsh   given by the male in flight.

References

Cited texts

Further reading

External links

 (Yellow bishop = ) Yellow-rumped widow - Species text in The Atlas of Southern African Birds

yellow bishop
Birds of Sub-Saharan Africa
Birds of the Gulf of Guinea
Fauna of the Ethiopian Highlands
yellow bishop
yellow bishop